The 2022–23 season is the 96th season in the existence of Sutton United Football Club and the club's second consecutive season in League Two. In addition to the league, they will also compete in the 2022–23 FA Cup, the 2022–23 EFL Cup and the 2022–23 EFL Trophy.

Pre-season and friendlies
On May 27, Sutton United announced their first two pre-season friendlies, against Dorking Wanderers and Havant & Waterlooville. Four days later, a home fixture against Woking was added to the calendar. On June 1, a home friendly against Bromley was announced. A third home friendly, against Charlton Athletic was also scheduled for the U's. The sixth and final friendly to be confirmed was against Dulwich Hamlet.

Competitions

Overall record

League Two

League table

Results summary

Results by round

Matches

On 23 June, the league fixtures were announced.

FA Cup

The U's were drawn at home to Farnborough in the first round.

EFL Cup

Sutton were drawn away to Milton Keynes Dons in the first round.

EFL Trophy

On 20 June, the initial Group stage draw was made, grouping Sutton United with Oxford United and Leyton Orient. Three days later, Chelsea U21s joined Southern Group G. In the second round, Sutton were drawn away to AFC Wimbledon.

Transfers

Transfers in

Loans in

Transfers out

Loans out

Squad statistics

Appearances

Goals

Assists

Clean sheets

Disciplinary record

Notes

References

Sutton United
Sutton United F.C. seasons
Sutton United
Sutton United
English football clubs 2022–23 season